Kingdown School is a mixed secondary school and sixth form in Warminster, Wiltshire, England for students aged 11 to 18. Since 1 August 2011, the school has been an academy.

History
Kingdown School was built in 1960 in the east of Warminster as a replacement for the Avenue and Sambourne secondary modern schools. It became a comprehensive in 1973 and gained academy status in 2011.

The school is run by Acorn Educational Trust, which manages several primary schools in the area as well as (from September 2018) The Clarendon Academy, a secondary school in the town of Trowbridge.

Houses
In September 2006, Kingdown adopted a house system, aimed at giving students a sense of community, family, and belonging, and eliminating hostile subcultures by allowing older students to provide a positive role model. Originally there were five houses, each named after a notable British sporting venue and led by a Head of House. In 2017 a sixth house, Silverstone, was added.

Each House consists of about a sixth of the students from each of Years 7 to 13, so about 280 students altogether. There are also tutor groups, each with approximately twenty-four students: four from each of Years 7 to 12/13, who meet their tutor for 20 minutes on every school day, beginning at 10.30 am. Members of each House come together for a house assembly once a week. Siblings are put into the same House, but usually not into the same tutor group.

Ofsted and academic achievements 
The school was awarded dual specialisms in Sports and Applied Learning, also achieving Artsmark Silver and Sportsmark Gold awards. In its 2003 report, Ofsted rated the school "good" overall, rating the quality of education as "very good". The 2008 inspection rated both the school and sixth form "outstanding". Following the 2013 inspection its rating had returned to "good", on which the school commented "It is very hard to compare previous (2008) and current inspections (2013) not least as the four headings are a new addition since 2008 and the bar to achieve an outstanding rating has truly been raised".

Notable staff 
John Atyeo (1932–1993), prolific goal-scorer for Bristol City who also scored for England, taught mathematics after retiring from football and rose to deputy headmaster.

Notable pupils 

 Ceawlin Thynn, 8th Marquess of Bath

References

External links 
 
Acorn Education Trust

Secondary schools in Wiltshire
Academies in Wiltshire
Warminster